The Finnish 27th Jäger Battalion was an elite light infantry unit in the German Army from 1915 to 1918 which consisted mainly of volunteers of the Finnish Jäger troops.

The recruitment of the Jäger volunteers from the Russian Grand Duchy of Finland had to be secret, and was dominated by German-influenced circles, such as university students and the upper middle class. The recruitment was however in no way exclusive. The recruits were transported across Finland's western border via Sweden to Germany, where the volunteers were formed into the Royal Prussian 27th Jäger Battalion. It was a continuation and expansion of the "Boy Scout Training" (Pfadfinderkursus).

Scout course and permanent training group
Later, the Pfadfinderkursus received more permanent forms and the course was changed into a permanent training group in Lockstedt, the Ausbildungs-Truppe-Lockstedt, which had given military training to Finnish volunteers eager to fight for independence.

More than 200 university students had participated in the so-called Boy Scout training – they dressed in Boy Scout uniforms during training, and they became the officers of the Finnish Jäger Troops. This group was expanded by extensive recruitment in the autumn of 1915 and spring of 1916. The goal was to increase the unit to 1,200 men, including artillery and pioneers. As the new recruits included working class young men and farmers as well as sailors, not many of them knew German. It was therefore necessary to create military guide books in Finnish, and a command vocabulary was created.

On 9 May 1916, the Lockstedt training group (Ausbildungs-Truppe-Lockstedt) was designated the Royal Prussian Jaeger Battalion number 27 (Königlich Preussisches Jägerbataillon Nr. 27) and received new, green German Jaeger uniforms. Some of the soldiers to be trained stayed in Ausbildungs-Truppe-Lockstedt and their unit preserved its name. If the number of the recruits had increased enough, Ausbildungs-Truppe-Lockstedt would itself have been formed in due course as a Jaeger battalion, but with the number 28 (i.e. ). This did not happen as there was no political initiative for this in Finland or in Germany, which were preparing for a separate peace with the Russian Empire in order to fight more effectively on the Western Front against France and the United Kingdom.

Regular battalion
To achieve experience from warfare, the main part of the Ausbildungs-Truppe-Lockstedt became a regular Jaeger battalion, the Royal Prussian Jaeger battalion number 27, which was used with relatively modest losses to attain experience, but also re-trained for the more technically demanding duties of artillery, engineers, supplies, etc. in order to establish this expertise in the future national army of the independent state of Finland.

The Jaeger Battalion participated in the ranks of the 8th German Army from 1916 in the battles of World War I on the northern flank of the Eastern Front. After the outbreak of the Civil War in Finland, Jaegers who intended to engage on the "White" (anti-communist) side in the war were released.

Periods

Pfadfinder-Kursus Lockstedter Lager

Pfadfinderkursus – the Pathfinder course – was the beginning of the new Finnish military training, as it had been abolished in the Grand Duchy of Finland due to the political schism in Finland between the Finns and the Russian imperial government. There were 189 Finns, one Norwegian Swede (Gösta af Geijerstam) and one Balt, altogether 191.

On 26 January 1915, the representatives of the German ministries for foreign affairs and also war, general headquarters and navy headquarters had made a decision to provide military training for 200 Finns. The commander was major Maximilian Bayer, who was a war veteran from the German African colonies and the chairman of the German Scout league, Deutsche Pfadfinderbund, which he established in 1907 and of which he served as the chairman, Reichsfeldmeister. In World War I, he had served in the Regiment Prinz Louis-Ferdinand, the 27th Infantry Regiment, and took part in the attack against Liège in Belgium. Thereafter, he had served as the German commandant of Liège from 5 January 1915. The original idea was to nominate the commander, one infantry captain and one pioneer captain, but the decision was to nominate four captains: Julius Knaths, Hans Bade, Walter Just and Karld Heldt. They all reported to the German Ministry for War on 13 February for instructions. In April 1915, Offiziersverstellvertreter Hans Eller was also ordered to the Pathfinder course, for machine gun training. From 12 to 13 non-commissioned officers were ordered to attend the course, and also six pioneers. The master sergeants (Fäbel) were Perper and Steinmuller, and the non-commissioned officers in lower ranks (Unteroffiziers) were Claussen, Huyssen, Hoden and Toeppel. Hoden and Toeppel were assigned to other duties later. The pioneer non-commissioned officer Claussen and machine gun trainer Huyssen continued to serve during the 27th Battalion period and became lieutenants.

The first Pathfinders came to the Lockstedt military training camp on 25 February 1915. The oldest member of the course was Alma Fabritius, who stayed for four months. Another older participant, doctor Marcus Kjöllerfeld, stayed six weeks from 25 February to April.

Later, when already Jaegers, two ex-Pathfinders resigned and two died from disease, Runar Appelberg and Urho Kalsko. Already in the service of the Guards, majors Friedel Jacobson, Olof Lagus and Armas Ståhlberg were killed in action in the Finnish Civil War 1918, as were Rittmeister (cavalry captain) Paul Ljungberg and Captain Bertel Paulig. Six other ex-Pathfinders died in the Civil War. Two of them were master sergeants (Fäbel) and the third was a sergeant. The last three did not have any military rank in Finland, for unknown reasons.

Captain Toivo Kuisma died in the Aunus attack in 1919, and Major Sven Weckström in 1921, having been wounded in Maaninkajärvi that year.

Later, the ex-Pathfinders achieved high military ranks:

Ausbildungs-Truppe-Lockstedt
 September 1915 – May 1916

Royal Prussian Jaegerbattallion number 27 9 May 1916 Königlich Preussisches Jägerbataillon Nr. 27

1916

Many German officers served in the battalion. The first commander was Major Maximillian Bayer, who became later a regimental commander on the Western Front. After him, the commander was Captain Julius Knaths.

Misa river period

Riga bay period

Liepaja Christmas period

Lielupe (Misse) period 1916/1917

Liepaja training period 1917/1918

Later, as Jaegers, two ex-Pathfinders resigned and two died from disease, Runar Appelberg and Urho Kalsko.

1918

Already in the service of the Guards, Majors Friedel Jacobson, Olof Lagus and Armas Ståhlberg were killed in action in the Finnish Civil War in 1918, as were Rittmeister (Cavalry captain) Paul Ljungberg and Captain Bertel Paulig. Six other ex-Pathfinders also died in the Civil War. Two of them were master sergeants (Fäbel), and the third was a sergeant. The last three did not have any military rank, for unknown reasons.

Killed in action in Finland 1918
Lauri Kutilainen, aliupseeri, 21 June 1896 – 3 April 1918.
Ahti Johannes Karppinen, vänrikki, 25 August 1895 – 28 April 1918.
Matti Leonard Kokko, korpraali, 23 October 1893 – 3 April 1918.
Nikolai Matias Perälä, aliupseeri, 23 August 1892 – 4 April 1918.
Johannes Pärmi, aliupseeri, 27 January 1892 – 5 April 1918.
Oivo Urbanus Rustanius, vänrikki, 17 July 1893 – 8 April 1918.
Frans Sandstedt, aliupseeri, 17 July 1899 – 3 April 1918.
Johan Vilhelms Sjöholm, vääpeli, 9 June 1897 – 3 April 1918.
Elias Teppola, aliupseeri, 25 December 1895 – 4 April 1918.
Emil Vainionpää, vääpeli, 7 January 1892 – 3 April 1918.
Juho Veijalainen, aliupseeri, 20 June 1892 – 3 April 1918.

1919

Captain Toivo Kuisma died in the Aunus attack 1919 and Major Sven Weckström in 1921, having been wounded in Maaninkajärvi that year.

Military ranks

May 1916 – February 1918

Misa river period
June 1916 – August 1916

Riga Bay period
September 1916 – December 1916

Liepaja Christmas period

Lielupe period
December 1916 – March 1917

Liepaja training period

The Liepaja training period consisted all kinds of special training from general leadership to special skills.

March 1917
25 March 1917 – 13 February 1918

April 1917
1 April 1917, 34 officers, 1277 others and 186 horses
2 April 1917, general von Shotzes inspection
10 April 1917, ten iron crosses for the jaegers
17 April 1917, politicians Fabritius, von Essen and Ekola paid visit
27 April 1917, notification of jaeger Herman Hirvonen's death in a hospital in Jelgava (then Mitau),

May 1917
1 May 37 officers, 1344 others, 190 horses

June 1917
1 June 36 officers, 1316 others, 190 horses

July 1917
1 July 36 officers, 1297 others, 190 horses

August 1917
1 August 34 officers, 1271 others, 191 horses

September 1917
1 September 34 officers, 1342 others, 159 horses

October 1917
1 October 24 officers, 1293 others, 155 horses

November 1917
1 November 22 officers, 1280 others, 157 horses

Jäger
Kalervo Kurkiala (lieutenant)
Rudolf Axel Danielson (21 March 1888 Pernå - 17 October 1938) was a Finnish Jaeger Major. His parents were the gardener and naval officer, Karl Gustaf Danielson and Emilia Sofia Johansson. His wife was Anna Maria Arlander.
Heikki Nurmio

See also
8th Ersatz Division (German Empire)
Klapkalnciems

References

Lauerma, Matti. Kuninkaallinen Preussin Jääkäripataljoona 27: vaiheet ja vaikutus. Porvoo, Helsinki: WSOY, 1966

External links 

Finnish Civil War
1910s in Finland
Military history of Finland
Expatriate military units and formations
Battalions of Germany
Military units and formations of Germany in World War I
Finnish expatriates in Germany
Finnish expatriates in Latvia